The 1921–22 Columbia men's ice hockey season was the 21st season of play for the program.

Season
Columbia opened their season with the first game ever played at Yale's new home building. The game was, unfortunately, a disaster for the Lions who were wholly unable to stop the Bulldog attack in a 10–2 loss. The next two contests, against Colgate and Princeton were both cancelled due to warm weather causing a lack of available ice, not an uncommon problem at the time. The extra practice served Columbia well as their next official game ended as a 4–3 overtime win over Princeton.

After a close loss to Penn, the team took two weeks off to study for mid-term exams before returning in early February against Hamilton. After dropping the match Columbia headed to Hanover to play Dartmouth at their winter carnival but a snowstorm caused the game to be called part-way through the second period. Columbia finished their season with two convincing home wins (a further game against Army was cancelled) leaving the team with its first non-losing season in a decade. Unfortunately, the team struggled to sell tickets for those games, an ill omen for the future of the program.

Douglas MacKay served as manager of the team until taking a job with the Winnipeg Tribune. After his departure W. A. Southall took over duties on a temporary basis.

Roster

Standings

Schedule and Results

|-
!colspan=12 style=";" | Regular Season

Scoring Statistics

Note: Assists were not recorded as a statistic.

References

Columbia Lions men's ice hockey seasons
Columbia
Columbia
Columbia
Columbia